CETI or Ceti may refer to:
 the genitive word used to identify the stars belonging to the constellation of Cetus, for example: Tau Ceti
 Communication with extraterrestrial intelligence
 Centro de Enseñanza Técnica Industrial
 Cetí, a fish from Puerto Rico